Keith Mansfield (born 1941 in London, England) is a British composer and arranger known for his creation of prominent television theme tunes, including the Grandstand theme for the BBC.

Career
Other works include "The Young Scene" (the original 1968 theme to The Big Match), "Light and Tuneful" (the opening theme for the BBC's coverage of the Wimbledon Tennis Championships), "World Champion" (the closing theme for NBC's coverage of the same tournament), and "World Series" (used for the BBC's athletics coverage). One of his library music recordings, "Teenage Carnival", was used as the theme to the cult 1960s ITV children's television series Freewheelers. He has also composed film scores for British movies such as Loot (1970) and Taste of Excitement (1970), and the western Three Bullets for a Long Gun (1971). He also scored the start-up and shutdown themes for Granada Television in 1978, which were used for ten years before it switched to 24-hour television.

Mansfield is probably best known by American audiences as the composer of the tune "Funky Fanfare", used for underscoring in the Astro Daters series of snipes produced by the National Screen Service in the late 1960s. That song is currently used during the opening credits of the show Pit Boss on Animal Planet, as well as backing music for the "Quick Hits" segment on the Sklarbro Country podcast. Mansfield also composed the brass tune "Superstar Fanfare", which was notably used (in several variations) by Channel Television in the Channel Islands, RTL plus's news programme 7 vor 7, Worldvision Enterprises, and by the Services Sound and Vision Corporation (SSVC) as a idents jingle for British Forces TV in West Germany, Berlin, Cyprus, The Falkland Islands and Gibraltar in the 1980s and 1990s.

The Astro Daters' "Our Next Attraction" was featured prominently in two films by Quentin Tarantino, Kill Bill and Death Proof. A vocal version of Funky Fanfare entitled "House of Jack" was also recorded by James Royal in 1969.  Another Mansfield composition, "National Pride," was the opening theme to the 1980 movie Fist of Fear, Touch of Death, which utilizes Mansfield's library music score, and as the logo jingle for CBS/Fox Video. A song remix was also used in the game, Saints Row: The Third.

In the 1960s and 1970s, Mansfield was a significant figure in the UK library music scene and recorded many materials for the production music company KPM. His work has been sampled by prominent hip-hop producers such as Danger Mouse ("Funky Fanfare" on the DANGERDOOM track "Old School Rules", "Junior Jet Set" on "Run" by Gnarls Barkley, and "Morning Broadway" on DANGERDOOM track "Space Ho's"), Madlib, as well as Fatboy Slim ("Young Scene" on the track "Punk to Funk") and most recently, "Walkin" by Denzel Curry, produced by Kal Banx.  American sports fans will find a lot of Mansfield's and other KPM composers' music used on NFL Films team highlights and Super Bowl documentaries. American sports journalist Jon Bois uses Mansfield's work ("Love De Luxe") in his videos.

Mansfield was arranger and conductor for several tracks on Dusty Springfield's 1968 UK album Dusty... Definitely, and acted as orchestral arranger on some hits for Love Affair ("Everlasting Love") and Marmalade ("Reflections of My Life"), among others. He also produced some work with Maynard Ferguson.

References

Further reading

Articles
Jonze, Tim (23 August 2016). "Grandstand, Countdown, Ski Sunday: the unsung heroes behind TV's greatest tunes". The Guardian.

Books
 Hollander, David; Masi, Dominic (2018). Unusual Sounds: The Hidden History of Library Music. Anthology Editions. .
 Kerridge, Adrian (2021). Tape's Rolling, Take One!. UK: M-Y Books. .

External links

Go Home Productions "Grandstand Supreme" Keith Mansfield-Supremes on YouTube

British composers
Living people
People educated at Upton Court Grammar School
Place of birth missing (living people)
Date of birth missing (living people)
1941 births
People from London